The 2014 Indian general election in Bihar was held in six phases on 10, 17, 24, 30 April, 7 and 12 May 2014.

Results

Party-wise

Constituency-wise Results

References

External links

2014 Indian general election by state or union territory